The 2016 ESPY Awards were held on July 13, 2016. The show, hosted by professional wrestler John Cena, was held in the Microsoft Theater in Los Angeles, California. 31 competitive awards and eight honorary awards were presented.

Winners and nominees 
Winners are listed first and highlighted in boldface.

Honorary awards

Arthur Ashe Courage Award

 Zaevion Dobson

Jimmy V Perseverance Award

 Craig Sager

Pat Tillman Award for Service

 Sgt. Elizabeth Marks

Best Moment
 Cleveland Cavaliers win the NBA Finals

Icon Award

 Abby Wambach
 Kobe Bryant
 Peyton Manning

Presenters

 Chris Berman
 Joe Biden
 Ciara
 Stephen Curry
 Skylar Diggins
 Lisa Leslie
 David Oyelowo
 Danica Patrick
 Miles Teller
 Justin Timberlake
 Usher
 Lindsey Vonn
 Dwyane Wade
 J. J. Watt
 Russell Wilson

Tribute

The ESPYs held a tribute to boxing legend Muhammad Ali, presented by Kareem Abdul-Jabbar and Chance the Rapper.

In Memoriam
Andra Day performed during the tribute with "Rearview" honoring the fallen sports stars:

 Pat Summitt
 Buddy Ryan
 Moses Malone
 Dave Mirra
 Meadowlark Lemon
 Dwayne Washington
 Darryl Dawkins
 Ed Snider
 Mel Daniels
 Joe Garagiola
 John "Hot Rod" Williams
 Justin Wilson
 Jimmy Roberts
 Lindy Infante
 Will Smith
 Doug Atkins
 Johan Cruyff
 Ted Marchibroda
 Bud Collins
 Kimbo Slice
 Frank Gifford
 Yogi Berra
 Monte Irvin
 Louise Suggs
 Jules Bianchi
 Al Arbour
 Jim Simpson
 Clyde Lovellette
 Dave Henderson
 Stephen Keshi
 Dolph Schayes
 Gordie Howe
 Muhammad Ali

References

External links
 Official website

2016
ESPY
ESPY
ESPY
ESPY